The 1944 United States presidential election in Delaware took place on November 7, 1944, as part of the 1944 United States presidential election. State voters chose three representatives, or electors, to the Electoral College, who voted for president and vice president.

Delaware was won by incumbent President Franklin D. Roosevelt (D–New York), running with Senator Harry S. Truman, with 54.38% of the popular vote, against Governor Thomas E. Dewey (R–New York), running with Governor John W. Bricker, with 45.27% of the popular vote.

Results

See also
 United States presidential elections in Delaware

References

Delaware
1944
1944 Delaware elections